Albert Young (born February 25, 1985) is a former American football running back who played for two seasons in the National Football League (NFL). After playing college football for the Iowa Hawkeyes, he was signed by the Minnesota Vikings as an undrafted free agent in 2008. He played for the Vikings in 2009 and 2010, before agreeing to become an assistant coach for the University of Colorado Buffaloes football team in 2012.

Early years
A resident of Moorestown, New Jersey, Young played high school football at Moorestown High School.
He remains the all-time leading rusher in South Jersey (5,411 yards) and after originally committing to University of Wisconsin-Madison to play football for Barry Alvarez's Badgers, he decomitted for the Iowa Hawkeyes in 2003.

Albert Young was selected by The Philadelphia Inquirer as the top South Jersey offensive player of the past decade.

Professional career

Minnesota Vikings
Young was signed to the Minnesota Vikings' practice squad in 2008 and to the active roster prior to the 2009 season. When Chester Taylor left the Vikings to join the Chicago Bears following the 2009 season, Young was promoted to second-string running back. However, during the beginning of 2010 season Young was replaced by Toby Gerhart as the third down back and second-string running back. On December 7, Young was placed on injured reserve.
On March 2, 2011, Albert Young was not tendered a contract offer by the Vikings, making him an unrestricted free agent.

Jacksonville Jaguars
On August 23, 2011, Young signed with the Jacksonville Jaguars.

Pittsburgh Steelers
On January 4, 2012, Young was signed to the practice squad of the Pittsburgh Steelers.

References

External links
Iowa Hawkeyes bio
Minnesota Vikings bio

1985 births
Living people
Moorestown High School alumni
People from Moorestown, New Jersey
Players of American football from New Jersey
Sportspeople from Burlington County, New Jersey
American football running backs
Iowa Hawkeyes football players
Minnesota Vikings players
Jacksonville Jaguars players
Pittsburgh Steelers players
Colorado Buffaloes football coaches